Iqela Lentsango: The Dagga Party of South Africa (more commonly known as the Dagga Party) is a South African political party founded in February 2009 by Jeremy Acton, who remains the party's leader. "Dagga" is a South African colloquial term for cannabis, the legalisation of which forms the core of the party's platform.  The Dagga Party was established to allow voters who support the legalisation of dagga to have representation in elections.

The party failed to register with the Independent Electoral Commission in order to contest the 2014 or 2019 South African general election because it could not raise the required R200,000 registration fee. However, the party entered into an alliance with African Democratic Change for 2019.

The party's position is that cannabis users should have the same rights as people who use tobacco and alcohol.

Acton was one of the people responsible for bringing the case before a South African court which resulted in the partial decriminalisation of dagga in South Africa.

References

External links
 Official website
 Facebook page
 Twitter page

Cannabis in South Africa
Cannabis political parties
Political parties established in 2009
2009 establishments in South Africa
2009 in cannabis
Political parties in South Africa
Political parties based in Johannesburg